Southmont may refer to:

 Southmont, North Carolina, United States
 Southmont, Pennsylvania, United States
 Southmont High School, in Montgomery County, Indiana, United States

See also
 South Mountain (disambiguation)